Raouf Abdou (born 1 December 1981) is an Egyptian modern pentathlete. He competed in the 2004 Summer Olympics.

References

1981 births
Living people
Modern pentathletes at the 2004 Summer Olympics
Egyptian male modern pentathletes
Olympic modern pentathletes of Egypt
Sportspeople from Cairo